Will Fowles (born 27 July 1978) is an Australian politician. He has been a Labor Party member of the Victorian Legislative Assembly since November 2018, representing the seat of Burwood in Melbourne's Eastern suburbs. Ahead of the 2022 Victorian state election, the seat of Burwood was abolished by Victoria's Electoral Boundaries Commission, leading Fowles to stand for the seat of Ringwood, where he resides with his family.

During his time in office, Fowles has voiced support for growing social housing and mental health reform. He is a member of the Legislative Assembly Environment and Planning Committee and has a small business background extending from hospitality to finance, property and strategic communication.

Early life and education

Fowles was born in 1978 and grew up in Hawthorn. His father was a business owner and his mother was a primary school teacher, who has since retrained as a nurse. He attended Saint Joseph's Primary School and then Scotch College. He has three younger brothers.

Fowles began his studies at Monash University in 1997, completing his Bachelor of Commerce in 2001 and his Bachelor of Laws in 2003. Fowles was elected President of the Monash Student Association for 2000, from a ticket composed primarily of Labor students.

Pre-parliamentary career
Following his graduation from Monash University, Fowles worked for Unilever and investment firm Scarborough Capital before starting his own business, Piper Capital, in 2006. Piper Capital managed a portfolio including the Food and Wine Co. in Melbourne and the Heritage Hotel in Rockhampton, Queensland. In 2015, Fowles founded Piper Communications, which provided strategic communications advice and advocacy for both commercial and not-for-profit clients.

Fowles has also served on key sporting boards and committees. In 2005, he became the youngest ever member of the MCC Committee, ultimately being re-elected twice and serving nine years in that role. Additionally, he was appointed as a Trustee of the Melbourne and Olympic Parks Trust in 2015, where he served until 2018.

Political career
Fowles joined the Australian Labor Party at age 21 and became involved in local branches in Hawthorn, Richmond and Burwood. A staunch Republican, he was elected as National Youth Convenor of the Australian Republican Movement at age 23. He continued to serve in various positions in the Republican Movement until 2018.

In 2002 Fowles stood as a candidate in the East Yarra by-election gaining an 8.8% swing to Labor, but failing narrowly to defeat Liberal MP Richard Dalla-Riva. In 2008, Fowles ran for Lord Mayor of Melbourne on the “Fowles: A Fresh Vision” ticket, advocating for stronger community engagement and accountability.

Member for Burwood
In the 2018 Victorian Election, Fowles stood as the Labor candidate for the seat of Burwood, in Melbourne's east, challenging incumbent Liberal MP Graham Watt. He campaigned on improved public transport, healthcare, education and jobs with the slogan Delivering for Burwood.  

Fowles secured 53.3% of the two-party preferred result thanks to a strong 6.47% swing towards Labor, unseating Graham Watt and becoming only the second Labor MP to hold the traditionally Liberal seat once held by former Premier Jeff Kennett. Fowles was sworn into office on 29 November 2018.

In this electorate, Fowles delivered upgrades to Parkhill Primary School, Wattle Park Primary School and Ashwood High School. He also secured in excess of $5m in funding to upgrade Wattle Park and has advocated for the Suburban Rail Loop, for which a station is planned in Burwood.

Fowles was appointed to the Legislative Assembly Environment and Planning Committee on 21 March 2019. Since then, the Committee has held inquiries into climate change action, environmental infrastructure and apartment design standards.

On July 25, 2019, Fowles was questioned by ACT Police in Canberra following an incident in which he had kicked in the door of a hotel room at the Abode Apartments in Kingston. Fowles was not charged with any offence and apologised for his actions, saying that he had been suffering from addiction and other mental health issues and had been attempting to retrieve medication from his luggage which was locked in the room. Fowles took a leave of absence to address his health issues and returned later in the year as an advocate for the government’s investment in mental health as recommended by the Mental Health Royal Commission.

Member for Ringwood
In October 2021, the Victorian Electoral Boundaries Commission released the Report on the Redivision of Victorian Electoral Boundaries 2020-2021, confirming that Fowles' seat of Burwood was to be abolished, and split between the existing seat of Box Hill and the new seat of Ashwood. This abolition resulted in Fowles standing for Ringwood electorate at the 2022 Victorian State Election, following the decision of incumbent Dustin Halse MP deciding not to recontest.

Fowles subsequently moved to Ringwood with his wife and their child, and won re-election at the 2022 Victorian state election with a 4.3% swing in his favour.

Policy positions
In his inaugural speech to Parliament following his election, Fowles spoke about the importance of addressing economic inequality and called for greater fairness in society. In particular, Fowles spoke about the need for more social housing, and the improved social mobility that stems from this. In his speech, he expressed his support for the labour movement and the goal of an Australian Republic. In Parliament, Fowles has spoken in favour of strong action on climate change, improved healthcare services, LGBTIQ+ rights, women's rights and investment in education and social housing.

Personal life
Fowles lives in Ringwood with his wife Jessica and has four children. He has been married twice, most recently in 2017.

Fowles is a strong advocate for mental health reform. Fowles has openly discussed his struggles with depression and anxiety, which he was diagnosed with in 2006. “My focus is on … working hard on my mental health and being a better rep”. He has since been a strong supporter of Victoria's Royal Commission into Mental Health, speaking in Parliament about his experiences with the mental health system after the final report was handed down in 2021.

Fowles is an accomplished charity auctioneer, having conducted hundreds of auctions for causes including indigenous empowerment, medical research and homelessness.

Fowles is a supporter of the Melbourne Demons and has been a member since 1996.

References

1978 births
Living people
Australian businesspeople
Monash Law School alumni
Australian Labor Party members of the Parliament of Victoria
Members of the Victorian Legislative Assembly
21st-century Australian politicians
People from Hawthorn, Victoria
People educated at Scotch College, Melbourne